Penicillium cosmopolitanum is a species of the genus of Penicillium which is named after the worldwide occurrence of this species.

See also
List of Penicillium species

References

cosmopolitanum
Fungi described in 2011